The De Sanzy was a French automobile manufactured only in 1924.  A product of Paris, it was a cyclecar with a two-stroke single-cylinder 350 cc engine, wooden chassis, and plywood body.

References

Defunct motor vehicle manufacturers of France